The Angel Hotel is a grade II* listed hotel in Angel Hill, Bury St Edmunds, Suffolk, England.

References

External links 

Hotels in Suffolk
Bury St Edmunds
Grade II* listed hotels
Grade II* listed buildings in Suffolk